Tarragona Amphitheatre is a Roman amphitheatre in the city of Tarraco, now Tarragona, in the Catalonia region of north-east Spain. It was built in the 2nd century AD, sited close to the forum of this provincial capital.

The amphitheatre could house up to 15,000 spectators, and measured .

History
It was built at the end of 1st century AD and the start of 2nd century AD, down from the walls and facing the sea. There are remains of a large inscription dating to the reign of Elagabalus (3rd century AD) and located in the podium.

In 259, during the persecution of Christians by Emperor Valerian, the city's bishop, Fructuosus, and his deacons, Augurius and Eulogius, were burned alive. After Christianity became the official religion of the empire, the amphitheatre lost its original functions. The following years some of the building's stones were used to build a basilica to commemorate the three martyrs. Tombs were excavated in the arena and funerary mausoleums were annexed to the church.

The Islamic invasion of Spain started a period of abandonment of the area, which lasted until the 12th century, when a church was built over the remains of the Visigothic church, in Romanesque style. This was demolished in 1915.

In 1576, it became the convent for the order of the Trinity until 1780 when it became a prison for prisoners who were constructing the port. After closing the prison, it was abandoned up to the mid-20th century when work was started to recover the theatre, funded by the Bryant Foundation.

See also
 List of Roman amphitheatres

Notes 

Buildings and structures completed in the 2nd century
Roman amphitheatres in Spain
Ancient Roman buildings and structures in Catalonia
Amphitheatre

de:Tarraco#Das Amphitheater